Urodeta talea is a moth of the family Elachistidae. It is found in the Democratic Republic of the Congo.

The wingspan is 6.2–7 mm. The ground colour of the forewings is pale ochre to ochre, mottled by dark ochre tips of scales. The hindwings are brownish grey.  Adults have been recorded from mid-March to late May.

Etymology
The species name is derived from the Latin talea (meaning a slender stick) and refers to the stick-shaped longitudinal sclerotization of phallus.

References

Elachistidae
Moths described in 2011
Insects of the Democratic Republic of the Congo
Moths of Africa
Endemic fauna of the Democratic Republic of the Congo